Huning or Huening is a surname. Notable people with the surname include:

Franz Huning (1827–1905), German-American pioneer and merchant
Mathias Huning (born 1969), German tennis player

Modern Notable People include:
Huening Kai (born 2002), American singer and member of boy group Tomorrow X Together
Huening Bahiyyih (born 2004), South Korean-American singer and member of girl group Kep1er, formed by Mnet's reality show, Girls Planet 999

See also 
 Huning Intercity Railway
 Huning Railway

References